Greatest Hits is the fourth compilation album and eleventh album by Mexican-American cumbia group A.B. Quintanilla y Los Kumbia Kings. It was released on April 3, 2007, by EMI Latin. Greatest Hits is the first album to be released after the breakup of Kumbia Kings. A DVD that included the music videos of all the songs was released on September 18, 2007.

Track listing

See also
 Greatest Hits DVD

References

2007 greatest hits albums
Kumbia Kings albums
A. B. Quintanilla albums
Albums produced by A.B. Quintanilla
Albums produced by Cruz Martínez
EMI Latin compilation albums
Spanish-language compilation albums
Cumbia albums
Albums recorded at Q-Productions